Neos Aionas Trikomou ("New Century Trikomou") was a Cypriot football club based in Trikomo. Founded in 1900, was playing sometimes in Second and sometimes in the Third and Fourth Division.

After the Turkish invasion of Cyprus and occupation of the city of Trikomo in 1974, the team was displaced to the southern part of the island, in Limassol. The football team dissolved in 1992 due to financial problems.

Honours
 Cypriot Third Division:
 Champions (1): 1973

References

Association football clubs disestablished in 1992
Defunct football clubs in Cyprus
Association football clubs established in 1900
1900 establishments in Cyprus
1992 disestablishments in Cyprus